Aadhunik Bharat Ke Bramharshi-Pt. Deendayal Upadhyaya is a 2017 nonfiction book written by Indian author and historian Vijay Nahar from Pali, Rajasthan and published by Pinkcity Publishers.

The book was unveiled by RSS Sarsanghchalak Mohan Bhagwat at Bharati Bhawan, Jaipur and released by Rajasthan Home Minister Gulab Chand Kataria at his residence. 
Nahar told the media at the press conference at Jalupura, Jaipur that his first chance to interact with Pt. Upadhyaya was at Sirohi, Rajasthan in 1962. After that there was a lot to meet as a RSS Pracharak. During this time, he got an opportunity to know Deendayal ji.

Through this book, Nahar put together the unitary humanism philosophy in front of the society on the basis of the principle of Indian culture. RSS chief Bhagwat praised the book and congratulated Nahar for spreading the teachings of Pandit Upadhyaya to people through the book. This is Nahar's 14th book based on facts which took them a month to write.

Contents 
The book contains the work of Upadhyaya for India. The book has been written in three sections. In the first section, the introduction of Pandit Deendayal's life, in the second, the conceptual position and the third, his inspiring context has been told. It was reviewed in the educational magazine Shaikshik Manthan, which noted its writer's unique style to convey the inspirational stories of Pandit Deendayal in a separate section after covering the life story and Ekatm Manavvaad principle of Upadhyaya.

References

2017 non-fiction books